Coach Terminal Station is an underground metro station in Ningbo, Zhejiang, China. Coach Terminal Station is situated on the east of Ningbo Coach Terminal. Construction of the station started in December 2010 and the station opened to service on September 26, 2015.

Exits 

Coach Terminal Station has 3 exits.

References 

Railway stations in Zhejiang
Railway stations in China opened in 2015
Ningbo Rail Transit stations